Loafing and Camouflage (1984) is a Greek comedy film directed by Nikos Perakis. It was followed by the motion picture Living Dangerously (Greek: BiOS + πολιτεία, romanized: BiOS + politeia; 1987 ), bringing the characters in a post-20 year "reunion". In 2005, Loafing and Camouflage: Sirens in the Aegean was released, bearing no relation to the first installment; instead, telling the story of a modern-day Army company. A TV series version of the movie aired for two seasons, featuring actors from the latest L&C movie in the roles of the original characters from the 1984 installment.

Synopsis
The film tells the story of a group of soldiers, who, during their compulsory military service in 1967 and 1968, before and during the Greek Junta, are assigned to the then-recently-founded Armed Forces Television. This TV station, founded for the civilian population, was run by the Army Cinematographic Unit which until then had only produced propaganda films and newsreels and was responsible for entertaining the troops and other charity organizations with movie screenings. The personnel was composed mostly of soldiers, who already had experience in the film business in their civilian lives, as well as those who received their training in the army.

The setting, characters and situations portrayed in the film are largely autobiographical. During his military service, Perakis helped set up the experimental Armed Forces Television station in the premises of the Hellenic Military Geographical Service, and the film shows a fictionalized account of this period.

Cast  
 Nikos Kalogeropoulos as Private Giannis Papadopoulos
 Giorgos Kimoulis as Private Achilleas Lambrou
 Takis Spyridakis as Private Panagiotis Balourdos
 Fotis Polychronopoulos as Private Michail Karamanos, aka Karamazov
 Giannis Chatziyannis as Private Petros Savidis
 Paris Tselios as Private Marlafekas
 Stavros Xenidis as Colonel A. Kontellis
 Andreas Filippidis as Lieutenant Colonel Minas Katsampelas
 Christos Valavanidis Major D. Karavidis
 Antonis Theodorakopoulos as Captain
 Nikos Tsachiridis as Sergeant Major
 Tania Kapsali as Emmanouella Dimaki
 Ifigenia Makati as Katerina Papadopoulou
 Rocky Taylor as Cindy
 Dimitris Poulikakos as John Papaloukas
 Michalis Maniatis as Mr. Karlatos
 Ira Papamichail as Soula

Awards
 Special Mention, 1985, Thessaloniki International Film Festival
 Grand Prix, 1984, Thessaloniki International Film Festival
 Best Screenplay, 1984, Thessaloniki International Film Festival
 Best Actor, 1984, Thessaloniki International Film Festival
 Best Editing, 1984, Thessaloniki International Film Festival
 Golden Bear, Nominated, 35th Berlin International Film Festival

References

External links
 

1984 films
Greek satirical films
1980s Greek-language films
Films directed by Nikos Perakis
Comedy films based on actual events
Films set in Greece
1980s political comedy films
Works about the Greek junta
1984 comedy films
Films about coups d'état
Films about propaganda